Lake Niegocin is a lake in the Masurian Lake District of Poland's Warmian-Masurian Voivodeship.

References

Lakes of Poland
Lakes of Warmian-Masurian Voivodeship
Giżycko County